The 2002 FIVB World Grand Prix was the tenth women's volleyball tournament of its kind. The event was held over four weeks in three countries and six cities throughout Asia: Philippines, Thailand, PR China, Chinese Taipei and Japan, culminating with the final round at Hong Kong Coliseum in Hong Kong from 1 to 4 August 2002.

Competing nations

Qualification process

Calendar

Teams

Preliminary rounds

Ranking
The host China and top four teams in the preliminary round advance to the Final round.

|}

First round

Group A
Venue: Yoyogi National Stadium, Tokyo, Japan

|}

Group B
Venue: Sichuan Provincial Gymnasium, Chengdu, China

|}

Second round

Group C
Venue: Araneta Coliseum, Quezon City, Philippines

|}

Group D
Venue: M.C.C. Hall, Nakhon Ratchasima, Thailand

|}

Third round

Group E
Venue: Macau Forum, Macau

|}

Group F
Venue: Miao Li County Dome, Miaoli, Taiwan

|}

Final round
Venue: Hong Kong Coliseum, Hong Kong

Round Robin 

|}

|}

3rd place match 

|}

Final 

|}

Final standings

Individual awards
Most Valuable Player:

Best Spiker:

Best Blocker:

Best Server:

Best Libero:

Statistical leaders 
Best Scorer:

Best Digger:

Best Setter:

Best Receiver:

References
Results

FIVB World Grand Prix
2002 in Hong Kong sport
International volleyball competitions hosted by Hong Kong
2002